D59 is a field camp in Antarctica on the land traverse between Dumont d'Urville (French coastal station) and Dome C (Franco-Italian high antarctic plateau station). It is known mainly for the two LC-130 crashes which happened in 1971 (eventually repaired and recovered 16 years later) and 1987 (two dead, wreckage abandoned).

See also
 List of Antarctic field camps

External links
 D59 C130 crashes and recovery efforts
 The story of 321

Outposts of Antarctica